Paucidentula is a monotypic genus of worms belonging to the monotypic family Paucidentulidae. The only species is Paucidentula anonyma.

The species is found in Atlantic Ocean.

References

Gnathostomulida
Platyzoa genera
Monotypic animal genera